Bojana Jovanovski was the defending champion, but lost in the second round to Ons Jabeur.
Elina Svitolina won the title, defeating Shahar Pe'er in the final 6–4, 6–4.

Seeds

Draw

Finals

Top half

Bottom half

Qualifying

Seeds

Qualifiers

Qualifying draw

First qualifier

Second qualifier

Third qualifier

Fourth qualifier

Fifth qualifier

Sixth qualifier

References

 Main Draw
 Qualifying Draw

Baku Cup - Singles
2013 Singles